Empire Buckler was a  cargo ship which was built in 1941 by Lithgows Ltd for the Ministry of War Transport (MoWT). Postwar she was sold into merchant service, being renamed Ovingdean Grange, Sabrina, and Noemi, serving until she ran aground in 1965 and was declared a constructive total loss.

Description
Empire Buckler was built by Lithgows Ltd, Port Glasgow. She was yard number 979. Launched on 30 June 1942, she was completed in September 1942.

The engine was built by D Rowan & Co Ltd, Glasgow. She had a GRT of 7,046 with a NRT of 4,906. Her DWT was 9,959.

Career

Wartime
Empire Buckler's port of registry was Greenock. She was operated under the management of Houlder Brothers Ltd. She was a member of a number of convoys during the Second World War.

KMS 2
Convoy KMS 2 departed from Loch Ewe on 25 October 1942, with sections sailing from Liverpool and the Clyde on 26 October. It arrived at Gibraltar on 10 November, Oran, Algeria, on 11 November, and Algiers on 12 November. Empire Buckler was carrying a cargo of 600 tons of petrol, 843 tons of stores, and nine troops. On 27 October, Empire Buckler hauled out from the convoy as her cargo had shifted. She later rejoined the convoy.

MKS 3X
Convoy MKS 3X departed Bône, Algeria, on 3 December 1942, and arrived at Liverpool on 19 December. Empire Buckler joined the convoy at Gibraltar. On 14 December, Empire Buckler lost her propeller and was adrift for several days. She arrived at Swansea under tow on 20 December.

MKS 9
Convoy MKS 9 departed Bône on 4 March 1943, and Algiers on 6 March. It arrived at Liverpool on 18 March. Empire Buckler was likely a member of this convoy.

Postwar
In 1946, Empire Buckler was sold to Houlder Bros and renamed Ovingdean Grange. She served Houlder's until 1959 when she was sold to Devon Shipping Co, Liberia, and renamed Sabrina. She was operated under the management of Empresa Navigacion Proamar SRL, Argentina. In 1961, she was sold to Compagnia Navigazione Marcasa SA and renamed Noemi. She was reflagged to Lebanon and operated under the management of J Livanos & Sons Ltd, London. On 17 December 1965, Noemi ran aground at Masirah, Oman, and was declared a constructive total loss. The wreckage of the ship was then partially salvaged.

Official Numbers and Code Letters

Official Numbers were a forerunner to IMO Numbers. Empire Buckler, and Ovingdean Grange had the UK Official Number 168987. Sabrina had the Liberian Official Number 1354 Empire Buckler and Ovingdean Grange used the Code Letters BCVV.

Culture and media
Empire Buckler under tow after the loss of her propeller is the subject of a painting by Montague Dawson.

References

External links
Photo of Ovingdean Grange

1942 ships
Ships built on the River Clyde
Empire ships
Ministry of War Transport ships
Steamships of the United Kingdom
Merchant ships of the United Kingdom
Steamships of Liberia
Merchant ships of Liberia
Steamships of Lebanon
Merchant ships of Lebanon
Maritime incidents in 1965